Tetiiv, (formerly called Tetiyev) is a city in Bila Tserkva Raion in the Kyiv Region in Ukraine. Tetiiv has a railway station on the Southwestern Railways Koziatyn - Zhashkiv line. It hosts the administration of Tetiiv urban hromada, one of the hromadas of Ukraine. The population is  The city is located on two banks of the Roska River, into which the right tributaries of the Rosishka and Dubravka flow.

Transport 

The main form of transportation is the Kozyatin-Zhashkiv railway, which passes through the city. There are two railway stations: Tetiiv and Sloboda Post, which are both located in the western part of the city.

Important buildings 

  is a Polish Catholic stone church built at the beginning of the 19th century.
 The partially damaged Church of the Assumption of the Blessed Virgin Mary.  The Geographical Dictionary of the Kingdom of Poland writes that ... "Latins have in Tetiiv their church a stone parish named after St. John of Nepomucen, Build in the current century (XIX)." In Soviet times, the church became part of the Electronmash factory.
 Monument to the Magdeburg Law, erected on May 2, 2016 in honor of the 410 anniversary of the receipt.
 Memorial on the site of the Tetiiv city hall
 Barrow "Red Grave", four ancient burial places
 , built in 1812
Monument to the victims of the Holodomor of 1932-1933
Monument to executed members of Koliivshchyna
Monument to Andrew the First-Called
Monument to Princess Olga
 Memorial at the city's old Jewish cemetery

History 
Tetiiv was first inhabited by Jews since the 17th century, with many members of the community dying in a massacre by Haydamaks in 1768. Despite this, Tetiiv continued to exist as a shtetl and held a 95% Jewish population in 1897.

In August 1919, Cossacks from the White Army ransacked the city, killing dozens of Jews. This was followed by a larger pogrom in March 1920, in which White Soldiers went door to door destroying Jewish houses and killing civilians on sight, culminating in an arson attack on the synagogue while it housed 2,000 worshipers inside, followed by the gunning down of any survivors who tried to escape.

An estimated 3,000-4,000 Jews died due to the Tetiyev pogroms and the remaining Jewish population completely fled the city, only returning a decade later.

A significant diaspora from Tetiyev immigrated to Cleveland, Ohio, where they established the Oheb Zedek-Cedar Sinai Synagogue.

The city was occupied by Nazi Germany from 1941-1944.

Until 18 July 2020, Tetiiv was the administrative center of Tetiiv Raion. The raion was abolished that day as part of the administrative reform of Ukraine, which reduced the number of raions of Kyiv Oblast to seven. The area of Tetiiva Raion was merged into Bila Tserkva Raion.

Politics 

Since May 17, 2018, Tetiiv has been a member of the European Union's Mayors for Economic Growth Initiative. The city has made an emissions reduction program that intends to cut down on carbon emissions by 30% by 2030, with a long-term goal of 50%.

Since 2017, the Tetiiv City has been the administrative center of the Tetiiv city united territorial community. The community includes 13 counties.

Tetiiv is a member of the following organizations:

 
 
The mayor of Tetiiv is Bogdan Balagura.

Local celebrations

Tetiiv City Day
Since 2016, City Day celebrations have been postponing to the first decade of May, when Tetiiv received self-government under Magdeburg Law, namely on May 4, 1606, at the request of Prince Janush Ostrozhskiy.

Notable people 

 (* 1935) - Ukrainian scientist, candidate of historical sciences, professor.
Bileush Domna Nikolaevna - , founder of the Museum of History, Tetiev.
 (* 1947) - Ukrainian politician
 - Ukrainian TV presenter and model. After her death in 2004, she was buried in a local cemetery.
 - Jewish citizen who formed self-defence militias called zelbshuts to defend Jews against the pogroms
 (1990-2015) - senior soldier of the Armed forces of Ukraine, participant in the Russian-Ukrainian war.
David Fishman - professor of physics, Hero of Socialist Labor, laureate of the Lenin and State Prizes of the Soviet Union
 (1967) - Ukrainian geographer-cartographer, candidate of geographical sciences, associate professor of the Department of Geography, Taras Shevchenko National University of Kyiv.
Zyma (Buzhenetska) Galyna Ivanivna (1944) - Ukrainian scientist-economist, candidate of economic sciences, professor of Poltava University of Economics and Trade named after Mikhail Tugan-Baranovsky.
 - Ukrainian scientist in the field of surface quality of metals, reliability and durability of machines.
 (1960-2014) - a soldier of the Armed Forces of Ukraine, a participant in the Russo-Ukrainian war.
Rogal Vitaliy Sergiyovich - A People's Artist of Russia.
 (1914-2002) - Israeli poet, translator, playwright
Phil Spitalny - musician  (November 7, 1890 – October 11, 1970)
Teslyuk Georgy Mykhailovich (1979-2016) - volunteer doctor, participant in the Russo-Ukrainian war
 (1969-2015) - senior sergeant of the Armed forces of Ukraine, a participant in the Russo-Ukrainian war.
 (born 1987) - Ukrainian biathlete

Gallery

References

External links
tetiev.net.ua
Jewish history of Tetiiv

Cities in Kyiv Oblast
Shtetls
1185 establishments in Europe
Cities of district significance in Ukraine